Shaftalu Bagh may refer to:
 Shaftalu Bagh-e Olya
 Shaftalu Bagh-e Sofla